Death Adder is the name of two supervillains appearing in American comic books published by Marvel Comics. The original Death Adder (Roland Burroughs) first appeared in Marvel Two-in-One #64 (June 1980), created by writers Mark Gruenwald and Ralph Macchio. The second Death Adder (Theodore Scott), first appeared in Civil War Files #1 and was based on the concept of the original Death Adder.

Burroughs was a hired criminal that was given his powers by the Brand Corporation that gave him razor sharp claws, gills and a long tail, but also left him mute. After a failed mission to steal the Serpent Crown Death Adder joined up with Sidewinder as Sidewinder created the Serpent Society. During the Society's first mission, Death Adder killed MODOK using his poisoned talons. During a mission he was shot and killed by the vigilante known as the Scourge of the Underworld. He was later briefly reviewed to be part of the Legion of the Unliving and then brought back to life by the Hood to fight the Punisher.

Theodore Scott, the second Death Adder, first appeared during the Civil War storyline in 2005-2006 as one of the criminals forced to join the Thunderbolts army. He would later join the Serpent Society just like his predecessor, he also became part of Serpent Solutions when the group was reorganized during the All-New, All-Different Marvel relaunch of several Marvel comic books.

Publication history

The first Death Adder first appeared in Marvel Two-in-One #64 (June 1980), and was created by Mark Gruenwald and Ralph Macchio. His identity was revealed by Rick Remender during an interview for ComicBookResources as the Death Adder who had been resurrected.

Fictional character biography

Roland Burroughs

Roland Burroughs was born in Rochester, New York. A small-time thug, Death Adder is chosen by Roxxon Oil Company to participate in a covert operation to retrieve the powerful Serpent Crown from the Atlantic Ocean. At Roxxon's Mutagenic Laboratory, Roland is surgically given gills and a bionic tail, as well as poison-tipped claws, to help him in his endeavors. An accident happens during this process which renders Death Adder mute. During the mission, he and his group, the third Serpent Squad, came into direct conflict with the heroes known as The Thing, Stingray, and Triton. The Serpent Squad is successful in finding the Serpent Crown, but are defeated by the heroes and taken into custody.

He and his former teammates, Black Mamba and Anaconda, joined with him again to infiltrate a zoo to sabotage Tony Stark's automatic animal-feeder and find a valuable weapon known as the "microscanner". This device scans and disrupts various body functions. They are ambushed and defeated by Iron Man, but were able to escape. They later receive an invitation to join Sidewinder's Serpent Society. All three attended the first organizational meeting of the Serpent Society. It was there in the Serpent Society that Death Adder was able to shine, killing MODOK during their first mission by scrapes of his poisoned talons. He encounters Captain America during this mission. He also participates in a mission to kill Captain America, whom the retired Porcupine had ostensibly captured. This ruse is actually devised by the Captain, and it eventually leads to a battle which Death Adder (along with Cottonmouth and Rattler) lost; the three of them are after a time bailed out by Sidewinder, however.

When ordered to bring the failed Princess Python back to her original group, the Circus of Crime, Death Adder's serpent saucer crashes in the South Bronx after it gets hit by an unknown weapon. Leaving Princess Python where she was and attempting to take a cab back to the base, he is shot and killed by the vigilante known as the Scourge of the Underworld, who is posing as the cab driver.  His body is later found by Sidewinder, and his closest friends Anaconda and Black Mamba were able to mourn his death. It is later revealed that it was apparently also the Scourge who shot Death Adder out of the sky in the first place.

Death Adder, among other villains, was revived by the Grandmaster and as part of the Legion of the Unliving was pitted against the Avengers. He eventually poisoned and killed Tigra, but after Death was freed from her imprisonment, she reverted the world back to the way it was before The Grandmaster's meddling.<ref>'The 'Avengers Annual #16</ref>

Death Adder was later among the seventeen criminals, all murdered by the Scourge, to be resurrected by Hood using the power of Dormammu as part of a squad assembled to eliminate the Punisher. He will be teamed up with the Basilisk. The Hood hosts a meeting for the resurrected criminals and explains to them that they have to kill the Punisher, telling them it was the Punisher who acted as the Scourge who killed them, and that if they do not kill the Punisher after one month the spell will end. Death Adder and Basilisk hold G.W. Bridge's family hostage to make him tell them where they can find the Punisher. Death Adder is one of the few villains to survive the battle against Punisher and Bridge, with it being implied in his next appearance  that the Hood, in spite of his failure to kill the Punisher, performed the necessary spell required to ensure Death Adder's normal life span was restored. Along the way, Death Adder underwent surgeries provided to him via the Hood to undergo a major physical transformation. No longer does Death Adder wear a mask, as his face now resembles a chicken/lizard hybrid with a beak for a mouth and a fin much like his original mask possessed.

Death Adder later appears as part of the new Crime Master's syndicate that serves as the main antagonist in the 2010 Venom series. He later becomes a member of Crime Master's Savage Six, a super-powered team to do his bidding. Death Adder is later killed by Venom.

Theodore Scott

A new Death Adder appeared during Civil War. He is seen alongside many others criminals in the Thunderbolts army. Death Adder has been identified as one of the 142 registered superheroes who appear on the cover of the comic book Avengers: The Initiative #1.

During the Secret Invasion storyline, the new Death Adder joined the Serpent Society. The Society held a number of civilians hostage in a compound in the American Midwest claiming they were protecting themselves from the Skrulls. However, they were easily defeated by Nova and his new Nova Corps.

As part of the All-New, All-Different Marvel event, Death Adder appears as a member of Viper's Serpent Society under its new name of Serpent Solutions.

During the "Opening Salvo" part of the Secret Empire storyline, Death Adder was with Serpent Solutions at the time when they are recruited by Baron Helmut Zemo to join his Army of Evil.

Later, Death Adder joined Belladonna's Assassins Guild. Alongside several other assassins, Death Adder confronted Deadpool. Before the battle began, Deadpool killed Death Adder by throwing a shuriken into his skull. After realizing it hit Death Adder, Deadpool joked that he was aiming for Lord Deathstrike.

Powers and abilities
Through mutagenic experimentation by the Brand Corporation, the first Death Adder's strength, stamina, durability, agility, and reflexes were artificially enhanced. He also became amphibious, able to breathe underwater through artificial gills as well as breathing on land through his nose. His anatomy was bionically bolstered to be able to withstand the ocean depths. His eyes were augmented to be able to see clearly in the murky depths of the ocean. He had a bionic tail which he could control like a fifth limb. He was able to swim at superhuman speeds. Death Adder wore lightweight full body armor supplied by the Brand Corporation, which included special spike-studded casing for his tail and titanium talons on his gloves. He sometimes filled the reservoirs in each of his gloved fingers with snake venom which could be squeezed through a tiny hole in each of his talons. Roland Burroughs had a college degree in engineering.

Other versions
Ultimate Marvel
Death Adder appeared in the Ultimate Marvel universe, though this version is actually female and was portrayed as a normal female who wore civilian clothing and had green lizard-like skin, along with her tail and claws. She works alongside the Serpent Squad and battles the Fantastic Four while searching for the Serpent Crown. She later reappears with the Serpent Squad, having escaped prison and once again searching for the Serpent Crown inside Project Pegasus. She was defeated by Spider-Man, the Human Torch, Iceman, and Rick Jones. A second, male Death Adder appears much later as a member of the street gang called the Serpent Skulls. He commanded his own punk-themed underlings. He was killed by the bloodthirsty vigilante Scourge during the final showdown with the All-New Ultimates. The female Death Adder most recently appeared alongside the Serpent Squad, once again stealing the Serpent Crown. This time, they were defeated by Spider-Man and the All-New Ultimates.

Earth-33900
In the Avengers series dedicated to the American Armed Forces, Death Adder appears as a member of the Serpent Society. Unlike the original Death Adder, this version was not mute (which may indicate he is the Theodore Scott version).

In other media
 Death Adder makes non-speaking appearances in The Avengers: Earth's Mightiest Heroes as a member of the Serpent Society.
 A female incarnation of Death Adder appears in Marvel Disk Wars: The Avengers'' as a member of the Serpent Society.

References

External links
 Death Adder I at Marvel.com
 
 
 

Characters created by Mark Gruenwald
Characters created by Ralph Macchio
Comics characters introduced in 1980
Fictional characters from New York (state)
Fictional mute characters
Marvel Comics characters with superhuman strength
Marvel Comics mutates
Marvel Comics supervillains